William Hamilton Osborne (January 7, 1873 - December 25, 1942) was a lawyer and writer in the U.S. whose work includes stories, novels, and screenplays. Two novels he wrote were made into films and he wrote the screenplay for another. His work was published in various magazines and The Witch's Tales. The Red Mouse is a  five act play that starred Valerie Bergere adapted by H.J.W. Dam from Osborne's novel. The New Jersey Historical Society has a collection of his papers donated by his wife.

He studied at Columbia University School of Law and represented the Authors League of America.

Bibliography

Books
The Red Mouse: A Mystery Romance (1909)
The Catspaw (1911), illustrated by, F. Graham Cootes
The Blue Buckle (1913)
The Boomerang (1915)
Neal of the Navy, novelized from the movie he wrote
The Girl of Lost Island (1916)
How to Make Your Will (1917)
The Running Fight
The Sharpshooters
The Disappearing Coin
After Death WhatThe Stroheim Stethoscope (1926)Am Narrenseil (1928)

Stories
"An Eye opener”  in Sunset Magazine vol. 31, about baseball
"The Great Boudoor Scene" (1914), Sunset"Jim Cradlebaugh, Head-Liner" (1908)
"Hitting the Rainbow Trail" (1918), with Phil Norton

FilmographyNeal of the Navy (1915)The Running Fight (1915), based on his novelHearts or Diamonds? (1918), listed as one of the writersThe Boomerang (film)'' (1919), based on his novel

References

External links
Works by William Hamilton Osborne at Project Gutenberg
Findagrave entry
IMDb page

1873 births
1942 deaths
American mystery novelists
20th-century American screenwriters